Col de la Givrine (el. 1228 m.) is a high mountain pass in the Jura Mountains in the canton of Vaud in Switzerland, near the border with France.

It connects Nyon in Switzerland and Morez in France. The maximum grade of the pass road is 8 percent. The pass is crossed by the Nyon–St-Cergue–La Cure railway, although the railway stops at the French border. It is the highest railway in the Jura Mountains.

References

See also

 List of highest paved roads in Europe
 List of mountain passes
List of the highest Swiss passes

Givrine
Givrine
Mountain passes of the canton of Vaud
Rail mountain passes of Switzerland